Blown Away is the fourth studio album by American singer and songwriter Carrie Underwood. It was released in the United States and Canada on May 1, 2012, by Arista Nashville. After finishing her successful Play On Tour in December 2010 to promote her third studio album Play On, Underwood started working on the album, but took her time, as she "wanted to change things up", and needed to step away from the "celebrity bubble" to "have real things to write about and to sing about". It took her over one year to finish the album, which, according to Underwood, ended up having a "darker storyline" than her previous efforts.

Met with mostly positive reviews from music critics, the album became a commercial success. It debuted at number one on Billboard 200, with first-week sales of 267,000 copies, achieving the third-largest opening of 2012. With Blown Away reaching number one, Underwood became the third female to chart at number one on the Billboard 200 with three country albums, tying her with Linda Ronstadt and Faith Hill. Like her three previous albums, Blown Away debuted at the top of the Top Country Albums chart. The album remained at number one for a second week on the Billboard 200, becoming her first album to spend more than one week at the top of that chart. It topped the "Top Country Albums" chart for seven weeks.

Blown Away was the seventh best selling album overall and second best-selling country album of 2012 in the US. It finished 2012 with over 1.4 million copies sold worldwide, according to the International Federation of the Phonographic Industry. Blown Away has since sold around 1.8 million copies in the US and over two million copies worldwide. In January 2020, the album was certified 3x-Platinum by the RIAA.

It spawned the Billboard Hot 100 Top 20 and Country Airplay number-one singles "Good Girl" and "Blown Away", along with the Country Airplay top-two hits "Two Black Cadillacs" and "See You Again". All singles received multi-Platinum or Platinum certifications.

In 2013, at the 55th Grammy Awards, Underwood won the Grammy Award for Best Country Solo Performance for "Blown Away", which also won Best Country Song for its songwriters. The album won the American Music Award for Favorite Country Album.

Background and Composition
After Underwood's Play On Tour ended in December 2010, she started to work on her fourth studio album. Underwood took her time working on Blown Away. She stated that she "wanted to change things up", and she needed to step away from the "celebrity bubble" to "have real things to write about and real things to sing about." Sony Music Nashville chairman/CEO Gary Overton said that the singer "took nearly a year to compile and record the songs." Songwriters Chris Tompkins and Josh Kear wrote "Blown Away" and sent it to the singer. Underwood loved the song and recorded it, also naming her album Blown Away as it was the song that defined the album's darker direction. She then started writing material with several songwriters, including Hillary Lindsey and Kear. Together, the trio wrote "Two Black Cadillacs", which is about two women finding out that they both are involved in a relationship with the same man and set their differences aside to kill him. Underwood said that "it was so much fun to write and just be in that room" with Lindsey and Kear, as they "didn't really know what to expect or where we were headed or what we would end up with."

Underwood has stated that the album would contain material that is different from her previous efforts, since stating that Blown Away features songs with a "darker storyline." She has stated that she isn't trying to impress people with what [she] can do" and she doesn't "have to sing to the moon with every single song" with this project. The lead single, "Good Girl," is said to be the album's most upbeat track, with the other tracks creating a much darker record.
The album combines country, pop and rock genres. Ashley Gorley described writing the single, "Good Girl", saying, "I was out in Los Angeles working on projects with Chris [DeStefano.] Carrie happened to be out there, and Carrie’s management team had an idea for the three of us to all get together to write. I had written with Carrie and Chris several times separately, but never together. We all thought it would be a great combination and turns out we were right!”

Critical reception

Blown Away received mostly positive reviews from music critics. On Metacritic,  which assigns a normalized rating out of 100 to reviews from mainstream critics, the album received an average score of 70 based on 12 reviews, indicating "generally favorable reviews". Stephen Thomas Erlewine of Allmusic gave a positive review to the album, awarding it with four stars out of five and said: naturally, this showstopping act suits a former American Idol winner but, better still, this exercise in turn-of-the-millennium nostalgia is executed with skill and savvy, offering the kind of larger-than-life power ballads and cheerful, clomping arena country. This is Carrie's wheelhouse—she's meant to sing these oversized ballads and hooks, she's meant to look as unattainable as she does on the cover. She's meant to be a superstar and she's never seemed as comfortable with her calling as she does on Blown Away. Deborah Evans Price of Billboard praised the album, saying, "Underwood delivers her most adventurous album yet, tackling a variety of emotional topics, including abuse, infidelity, revenge and regret." Ian Ewing of Keepin' It Country  rated the album 9.5 on a scale of 10, and highlighted the title track, saying, "Although there's nothing to mark it as a country song, it's a stunning piece of music that can't help but impress." Daryl Addison of GAC praised the album, saying, "Carrie doesn't shy away from complexities, and with a powerful voice unafraid to push the envelope, Blown Away could be just the album to show what's possible for pop-influenced country." Jessica Nicholson of Country Weekly rated the album with four stars out of five and said: "This is easily Carrie’s most well-rounded and confident work to date". The New York Times gave a positive review to the album and said: Ms. Underwood enjoys rage; her huge voice, both naïve and muscular, is well suited to it. Her best songs have historically been in the range between fury and resentment. “Blown Away” is only her fourth album, but that number belies her concrete-hard place in the country firmament, with a combination of vocal ambition and toughness that recalls a younger Martina McBride. Eric Allen of American Songwriter gave a positive review, awarding it with four stars out of five and said: Blown Away displays considerable artistic and creative growth in both Underwood's songwriting and selection of material.  Is more thematic and unified, resulting in Underwood's strongest effort to date, which easily leaves her previous releases twisting in the wind. Melissa Maerz of Entertainment Weekly gave the album a B+, and referred to Blown Away as Underwood's "most stadium-rock-friendly album yet. At USA Today, Elysa Garnder told that the release "both reaffirms her natural gifts and makes us continue to root for her to push beyond them."

Mikael Wood of the Los Angeles Times was less than enthusiastic about the album, giving it two stars out of four, and saying that much of the album "finds Underwood using her remarkable voice to deliver feel-good bromides like those in the lightly-reggae-inflected 'One Way Ticket.'" While Johnathan Keefe of Slant magazine wasn't overly impressed with the album in his review, giving the album 3 stars, he did give Underwood credit for "at least tak[ing] far more creative risks than she ever has before and occasionally stray[ing] from a formula that had become stale and predictable." Melissa Newman of Hitfix gave the album a B, but criticized the album's material, calling it "a mixed bag, with the songs running the gamut from ranking among her best to wondering who the hell let some of them on the album." Sean Daly of Tampa Bay Times gave the album a C, saying, "Cliche pleadings for lost love dominate Blown Away, which sounds a lot more Hollywood safe than Nashville tough." Jody Rosen of Rolling Stone gave the album 2.5 out of 5 stars saying that "Underwood's voice is as powerful as ever, but Blown Away tries too hard, ratcheting up melodrama with strings and effects." At The Guardian, Caroline Sullivan felt that the album "may be too formulaic to give her much of a foothold."

Awards and nominations

Commercial performance
Blown Away debuted at number one in the United States on the Billboard 200 chart with first-week sales of 267,000 copies. It is Carrie Underwood's third number-one album on the chart, following Carnival Ride (2007) and Play On (2009). She is the third female to chart at number one on the Billboard 200 with three country albums, thus tying her with Linda Ronstadt and Faith Hill. Like her three previous albums, Blown Away also debuted at the top of the Top Country Albums chart, making Underwood only the second female to achieve that feat. In its second week, Blown Away stayed at number one, being Underwood's first album to spend more than a week at the top, selling 120,000 copies. Blown Away has topped the US Top Country Albums chart for seven weeks, being Underwood's longest run at number one on the chart since her debut album, Some Hearts, logged 27 weeks on top.

The album was the seventh best selling album of 2012 in the US, being the second time Underwood has an album inside the top 10 albums since her debut album Some Hearts (2005) landed at number three in 2006. It was number two for country albums. Blown Away finished 2012 with over 1,400,000 copies sold worldwide, according to the International Federation of the Phonographic Industry. As of October 2019, Blown Away has sold 1,853,200 copies in the US. It has sold over two million copies worldwide, becoming Underwood's fourth consecutive album to sell at least two million copies. In January 2020, the album received a 3x-Platinum certification from the RIAA for 3 million units in sales and streams.

In Canada, the album debuted at number one, with first-week sales of 17,300 copies. It also debuted at number four on the ARIA Top 50 Albums, and at number one on the ARIA Top 20 Country Albums charts in Australia. Her first-ever officially released album in the United Kingdom, Blown Away debuted at number eleven on the UK Top 100 Albums, and at number one on the UK Top Country Albums. It has since sold 61,000 copies in the United Kingdom and has been certified Silver by the BPI.

Promotion
With the release of her highly anticipated fourth album, Underwood made numerous television, radio, and online appearances. On April 29, Underwood was featured on Nightline, and on April 30, Good Morning America aired an exclusive interview. Later that evening, Underwood performed "Good Girl" on Late Show with David Letterman as well as holding a concert on the Live on Letterman webcast concert series streaming live online. On May 1, Underwood returned to Good Morning America to perform a special live outdoor concert in Times Square, followed by an iHeartRadio Live performance streaming live online that evening. Underwood appeared on American Idol on May 3 with a special performance of the title track from her album. Underwood also made appearances on The Ellen DeGeneres Show on May 9, Jimmy Kimmel Live! on May 10, and Dancing with the Stars on May 15, followed by the Billboard Music Awards on May 20. On May 26, she headlined at Bayou Country Superfest in Baton Rouge, Louisiana, performing several new songs from the album. Underwood kicked off the Blown Away Tour  during the summer of 2012.

Singles
The first single of the album, "Good Girl" was released on February 23, 2012, and it debuted at number thirty on the Hot Country Songs chart and number twenty-four on Hot 100. It eventually climbed to a peak of eighteen on the Hot 100, number one on the Hot Country Songs, number twenty on the Adult Pop Songs chart and number twenty-one on the Canadian Hot 100. It has been certified 2× Platinum by the RIAA and Platinum by Music Canada.

The second single of the album is "Blown Away". Before the official release of the song, it charted at number 66 on the Hot 100 and number 49 on the Hot Country Songs, and has since reached a peak of number twenty and two, respectively. It became Underwood's 16th number one single when it topped the Country Airplay chart. It is also her first song to chart in the UK Singles Chart where it has reached 155. It has been certified 3× Platinum by the RIAA and Platinum by the CRIA.

The third single of the album is "Two Black Cadillacs". It was released on November 18, 2012. The music video was released on January 23, 2013. The song peaked at number two on the Billboard Country Airplay chart and number four on Hot Country Songs and has been certified Platinum by the RIAA.

On March 18, 2013, Underwood announced via Twitter that "See You Again" would be the fourth single off the album. "See You Again" impacted Country radio on April 15. It reached number two on the Country Airplay chart and number seven on Hot Country Songs. On August 10, 2015, "See You Again" was certified Platinum by the RIAA.

Tour
The tour included an international run of shows during the summer of 2012, including her first-ever United Kingdom concert, taking place at the prestigious Royal Albert Hall in London on June 21. The Royal Albert Hall concert sold out within the first 90 minutes of public ticket sales. The opening act for Underwood on the North American leg of the tour was country singer Hunter Hayes. Underwood donated $1 from each ticket sold on the North American leg of the tour to support the Red Cross disaster relief. The first leg of The Blown Away Tour began in September 14 in Manchester and continued deep into December. Due to positive reception and successful touring revenue from the first North American leg of the tour, a second North American leg of the tour was announced for the spring of 2013. The tour ultimately ran through May 2013 and played to over one million fans over the course of 112 shows.

A concert DVD, The Blown Away Tour: Live, was released on August 13, 2013. The footage was captured during Underwood's concert in Ontario, California on March 3, 2013. The DVD includes more than twenty songs performed by Underwood on tour, as well as exclusive interviews with Underwood, tour director of The Blown Away Tour, Raj Kapoor, and other behind-the-scenes footage about the tour. The DVD has since been certified Gold by the RIAA.

Track listing

Personnel
Credits adapted from AllMusic.

Vocals
 Lead vocals – Carrie Underwood
 Backing vocals – Cary Barlowe, Perry Coleman, Wes Hightower, David Hodges, Hillary Lindsey, Gordie Sampson, Jenifer Wrinkle, Carrie Underwood

Musicians
 Charlie Judge – acoustic piano, Hammond B3 organ, keyboards, programming
 Jimmy Nichols – keyboards, acoustic piano, Wurlitzer electric piano
 Tom Bukovac – electric guitar, acoustic guitar
 Brad Paisley – electric guitar
 Ilya Toshinsky – acoustic guitar, bouzouki, mandolin, ukulele
 Dan Dugmore – steel guitar
 Aubrey Haynie – mandolin, fiddle
 Mike Johnson – dobro, steel guitar
 Jimmie Lee Sloas – bass guitar
 Paul Leim – drums
 Chris McHugh – drums
 Eric Darken – percussion
 Jonathan Yudkin – cello, fiddle

Technical and production
 Chris Ashburn – recording assistant, mix assistant 
 Adam Ayan – mastering at Gateway Mastering (Portland, Maine).
 Derek Bason – recording engineer, mixing
 Mark Bright – producer
 Charles Butler – digital editing
 Neal Cappellino – additional recording 
 Ann Edelblute – manager
 Mike "Frog" Griffith – production coordination
 Simon Fuller – manager
 David Hodges – additional recording 
 Christopher Small – digital editing
 Todd Tidwell – additional recording 
 Kirsten Wines – production assistant

Visuals and imagery
 Enzo Angileri – hair stylist
 Randee St. Nicholas – photography
 Francesca Tolot – make-up
 Emma Trask – stylist

Charts

Weekly charts

Singles

Year-end charts

Decade-end charts

Certifications

Release dates

References

19 Recordings albums
2012 albums
Albums produced by Mark Bright (record producer)
Arista Records albums
Carrie Underwood albums
Arista Nashville albums